The 1931 WANFL season was the 47th season of the Western Australian National Football League and the first under that moniker, having been called the West Australian Football League (WAFL) until 1930.

The season saw East Fremantle win its fourth consecutive premiership for the second time, having already done so between 1908 and 1911. It also saw a major revival by East Perth, who had fallen to a clear last in 1929.

Subiaco, a power since 1924, lost star rover Johnny Leonard to country Victoria but, despite four consecutive losses mid-season, won eight straight to reach the Second-Semi and Grand Finals only to face a much larger player drain than seen so far in the WANFL.

Home-and-away season

Round 1 (Labour Day)

Round 2

Round 3

Round 4

Round 5

Round 6 (Foundation Day)

Round 7

Round 8

Round 9

Round 10

Round 11

Round 12

Round 13

Round 14

Round 15

Round 16

Round 17

Round 18

Round 19

Round 20

Round 21

Ladder

Finals
Starting from this season, the league adopted the Page–McIntyre system of finals, in the same year as was done in the VFL. It eliminated the need for a challenge final and the uncertainty about the number of finals matches to be played, involving a fixed four finals matches exclusive of draws. This year, the first semi-final was drawn and this ensured the latest ever finish to a season, which reached as late as mid-October.

First semi-final

First semi-final replay

Second semi-final

Preliminary final

Grand Final

References

External links
Official WAFL website
WANFL Season 1931

West Australian Football League seasons
WANFL